Mike Kim (Michael Kim) is a professional poker player and the founder of Asian Poker Federation and MK Global Management Solutions Inc., a gaming service provider based in Metro Manila, Philippines.

Biography 
Kim started his career as an online poker player in 2003, while studying mechanical engineering at the University of Illinois. After realizing poker's financial potential, he started playing full-time. Kim established the first poker room in South Korea and launched a poker room in Macau at the Starworld Hotel.

In the Philippines, he opened and operated Solaire Poker Room at the Solaire Resort and Casino, Manila. Kim also opened LT Poker in Okada Manila. He later partnered with the online poker company PokerStars, at the City of Dreams in Manila.

In early 2016, Kim opened Mike's Room in Manila. The venue received a total of 1,403 entries for Kim's Millionaire Maker tournament.

Kim brought the Asian Poker Tour, the Asia Pacific Poker Tour and the World Poker Tour to the Philippines.

In 2018, Kim expanded his activities in Europe together with his European business partners Jori Falkstedt and Miikka Saloseutu.

Poker events 
At the 2009 PokerStars APPT Macau, Kim finished 2nd, winning $384,999. He finished 22nd in the 2013 PokerStars APPT Seoul and earned 4,750,000 KRW. At 2015 PokerStars APPT Season 9 Manila, Mike finished 15th and earned 274,400 PHP. Mike finished 5th in the 2013 WSOP Circuit River Rock Main Event, with $64,979 payouts. Kim won the Main Event of the PokerStars LIVE Manila Megastack 2 in 2015.

References 

World Poker Tour winners
Living people
Sportspeople from Las Vegas
Year of birth missing (living people)